The Girl in the Limousine is a 1924 American comedy film starring Larry Semon and featuring Oliver Hardy. The film is based on the 1919 play of the same name by Wilson Collison and Avery Hopwood.

Plot

Cast

Preservation
With no prints of The Girl in the Limousine located in any film archives, it is a lost film.

See also
 List of American films of 1924
 Oliver Hardy filmography
 List of lost films

References

External links

Stills at silenthollywood.com

1924 comedy films
1924 short films
1924 films
1924 lost films
American silent short films
American black-and-white films
American films based on plays
Films directed by Larry Semon
Films directed by Noel M. Smith
Lost American films
Silent American comedy films
American comedy short films
Lost comedy films
1920s American films